"Glow" is a duet by American singer-songwriters Kelly Clarkson and Chris Stapleton from her ninth studio album and second Christmas album, When Christmas Comes Around... (2021). Written by Clarkson, Danja, Jason Halbert, Hayley Warner, and Jesse Thomas, it was released a promotional single by Atlantic Records on October 15, 2021.

Background and release 
"Glow" is a soulful country Christmas ballad written by Clarkson, Danja, Jason Halbert, Hayley Warner, and Jesse Thomas. Produced by Halbert, the song is about the one special person who is missing from an otherwise perfect Christmas. Stapleton, who had previously co-wrote a song for Clarkson on the soundtrack to the feature film Trolls World Tour, was invited by Clarkson to record the song with her while recording the album's other tracks with Jesse Shatkin. First released on streaming platforms on October 15, 2021, "Glow" was originally scheduled to be sent to country radio stations as the second single from When Christmas Comes Around... on October 18, 2021, but was later pulled out of rotation.

Critical reception 
In his review of the album, Mike Dewald of Riff Magazine wrote that Stapleton's vocal performance perfectly complements Clarkson's. Country Now staff also shared the same sentiment. Michael Major of BroadwayWorld highlighted the track as a "cheerful standout" on the album.

Charts

Release history

References 

2021 singles
2021 songs
Atlantic Records singles
American Christmas songs
Chris Stapleton songs
Kelly Clarkson songs
Songs written by Danja (record producer)
Songs written by Kelly Clarkson
Songs written by Jason Halbert